Aidee Walker is a New Zealand film and television actress and television director.

Biography 
Walker grew up in Hamilton, and attended Hamilton Girls' High School. While there, she formed a rock band called Handsome Geoffrey with Anna Coddington and Janna Hawkes; the band went on to win the 1998 Smokefree Rockquest. She then moved to Auckland to study drama at Unitec Institute of Technology, graduating with a bachelor's degree in performing arts.

In 2005, Walker began appearing as the character Draska Droslic on the television series Outrageous Fortune, a role she continued in until 2010. She also spent some years overseas performing and studying. After returning to New Zealand, she started to write and perform her own work and then moved into writing and directing films. Her first short film, The F.E.U.C, was selected for the Palm Springs Short Film Festival in California and the Show Me Shorts Festival in New Zealand. Her second short film, Friday Tigers, was selected for the Melbourne International Film Festival.

Recognition 

 2018 Huawei Mate20 New Zealand Television Awards: nominated for Best Actress for Catching the Black Widow
 2013 New Zealand International Film Festival: Jury Prize for Best Short Film for Friday Tiger; Audience Choice Award for Favourite Short Film for Friday Tiger
 2012 Sorta Unofficial New Zealand Film Awards: nominated for Best Supporting Actress for How to Meet Girls from a Distance

Filmography

Film

Television

Video games

References

External links 
 
 

People educated at Hamilton Girls' High School
Living people
New Zealand film actresses
New Zealand television actresses
New Zealand television directors
Unitec Institute of Technology alumni
1981 births
Women television directors